Agase is a surname. Notable people with the surname include:

Alex Agase (1922–2007), American footballer and coach
Lou Agase (1924–2006), American footballer and coach